Kate Bracken (born 12 June 1990) is a Scottish actress. Bracken is best known for her role as Alex Millar in Being Human.

Early life
Bracken grew up just outside Fort William near the village of Spean Bridge. She attended Kilmonivaig Primary School before attending Lochaber High School. After graduating from Telford College, Edinburgh she went to Motherwell College, where she obtained an acting degree in 2011. She then met with casting directors, found representation from an agent, and moved to London.

Career
Bracken got her first acting television role when she made an appearance in Inspector George Gently in 2011, playing the character Hazel. In 2012 she was cast as a recurring character Alex Millar in the fourth series of British supernatural drama Being Human. Bracken appeared as Mia in an episode of New Tricks, before returning in the fifth series of Being Human as a series regular in early 2013, replacing Lenora Crichlow as the new ghostly character. Later in 2013, Bracken also appeared in series 5 of the hit television show Misfits as Karen, who has the power of camouflage.

In 2016 Bracken starred in Max McGill's short film Hot Property. In the same year she appeared as Grace in the BBC mini series One of Us.

Filmography

References

External links
 
 

1990 births
Living people
Scottish television actresses